Dragoș Agache (born March 8, 1984, in Brăila) is a Romanian swimmer, who specialized in breaststroke events. He set a new Romanian record of 27.47 to collect a silver medal in the 50 m breaststroke at the 2010 European Aquatics Championships in Budapest, Hungary.

Agache qualified for the men's 100 m breaststroke at the 2012 Summer Olympics in London, by clearing a FINA B-cut of 1:01.19 from the World Championships in Shanghai, China. He challenged seven other swimmers on the third heat, including two-time Olympians Martin Liivamägi of Estonia and Carlos Almeida of Portugal. He rounded out the field to last place by less than 0.14 of a second behind Poland's Dawid Szulich and Israel's Imri Ganiel in 1:02.93. Agache failed to advance into the semifinals, as he shared a thirty-seventh place tie with four-time Olympian Malick Fall of Senegal on the first day of preliminaries.

Agache is a former member of the swimming team for the Iowa Hawkeyes, and a graduate of management information systems at the University of Iowa in University Heights, Iowa (2008).

References

External links
Player Bio – Iowa Hawkeyes
NBC Olympics Profile

1984 births
Living people
Romanian male breaststroke swimmers
Olympic swimmers of Romania
Swimmers at the 2012 Summer Olympics
Sportspeople from Brăila
European Aquatics Championships medalists in swimming
Iowa Hawkeyes men's swimmers
20th-century Romanian people
21st-century Romanian people